The 57th Brigade was a formation of British Army. It was part of the new army also known as Kitchener's Army. It was assigned to the 19th (Western) Division and served on the Western Front during the First World War.

Thomas Cubitt, a future full general, commanded this brigade during the war.

Formation
The infantry battalions did not all serve at once, but all were assigned to the brigade during the war.
10th Battalion, Royal Warwickshire Regiment 	
8th Battalion, Gloucestershire Regiment 	
10th Battalion, Worcestershire Regiment
8th Battalion, North Staffordshire Regiment
3rd Battalion, Worcestershire Regiment
57th Machine Gun Company
57th Trench Mortar Battery

References

Infantry brigades of the British Army in World War I